Rocco Joseph Colonna (November 8, 1933 – August 7, 2011) was an American politician, having served as a member of the Ohio House of Representatives for over 20 years.

References

Danny V. Colonna Website
Rocco J. Colonna Industrial Park
State Liquor Control 

Democratic Party members of the Ohio House of Representatives
1933 births
2011 deaths
Politicians from Cleveland
People from Cuyahoga County, Ohio